Ginger Root is an American indie soul music project from Huntington Beach, California led by singer-songwriter and instrumentalist Cameron Lew. Lew has self-described the project's musical sound as "aggressive elevator soul", also citing inspiration as coming from groups such as Vulfpeck, Toro y Moi, White Denim, Yellow Magic Orchestra, and Feist. On tour, Ginger Root has supported bands such as Khruangbin, Hippo Campus, Omar Apollo and Last Dinosaurs, as well as headlining their own tour in Fall of 2022, with supporting artists King Pari, Vicky Farewell, and Amaiwana. 

In the studio, Ginger Root consists of solely Lew. On tour, Ginger Root also currently includes Lew's high school friends Matt Carney (drums) and Dylan Hovis (bass).

The music of Ginger Root is released under Acrophase Records.

History

Formation, Spotlight People, and Toaster_music (2016 - 2017) 
Ginger Root began as Lew was in the Huntington Beach-based band Van Stock. In mid-2016, he wrote a few songs that he felt didn't fit into the band's existing sound and made an EP out of them. According to Lew, that EP “turned into an LP”, becoming Spotlight People, and “I slapped the name Ginger Root on it", a name coming from a live Vulfpeck performance of "It Gets Funkier" he discovered on YouTube at 3 A.M one morning, where frontman Jack Stratton chanted "uh, uh ginger root".

In 2017, Lew began a weekly YouTube series called "Toaster Music" where he performed covers in his 2004 Honda Element. Lew says the idea came to him from not wanting to do homework during the four hour break between his classes on Mondays at Chapman University, where he would record vocals, guitar, keyboard, bass, and drums in the backseat, mixing it on his laptop via the car stereo. Afterwards, he would spend another two to three hours editing during his next lecture. Many of these covers  formed the basis for a compilation album, titled Toaster_music.

Mahjong Room (2018 - 2019) 
In June 2018, Ginger Root released a second album, Mahjong Room, featuring four previously released singles ("Two Step", "Call It Home", "Jeanie", and "Having Fun") and six other new songs. Alongside that release, Lew released a second album of covers from the ongoing "Toaster Music" project on Bandcamp, calling it Toaster_Music_v2.

In December 2018, Ginger Root recorded a live session at Audiotree's studios in Chicago, playing five songs from Mahjong Room.

The name "Mahjong Room" comes from a room Lew's great-grandmother had in her house, where all of his family members would gather, play Mahjong, and a five-year old Lew would come and try to shuffle the tiles. Eventually over time, it became somewhat of a storage room, the memory of it inspiring both the song and album, respectively.

Rikki (2020) 
In March 2020, Ginger Root released "Karaoke", the first single from their third album Rikki, which was originally slated to be released in June 2020, but was later delayed to October of that year due to complications from the COVID-19 pandemic.

Toaster Music v3, the third iteration of covers from the "Toaster Music" project, was released on Ginger Root's Bandcamp in May 2020.

On October 23, 2020, Ginger Root released Rikki, which includes the previously released singles "Karaoke", "Out of State", "Le château", and "Why Try" alongside seven new tracks.

The name of the album Rikki is from the misspelling (as Lew remembers) of the first word of a book titled Tikki Tikki Tembo.

City Slicker and Nisemono (2021-2022) 
In May 2021, Ginger Root announced via Twitter and Instagram the upcoming release of an EP, titled City Slicker, described by Lew as a soundtrack for the American adaptation of a fictitious 1980's Japanese film, expected to be released August 2021. Alongside the announcement, Ginger Root released a single from the EP, titled "Neighbor". Another single from the EP, "Loretta", was released in June 2021.

On July 21, 2021, Ginger Root released the single "Juban District", the name being a reference to the setting of the anime Sailor Moon. The album was released as a limited edition product on 2 analog physical formats, which were VHS and cassette tape. In November 2021, City Slicker was also released on vinyl through the crowd-funding/pre-sale service Qrates.  

On June 14, 2022, Ginger Root announced another upcoming release of an EP titled Nisemono  The tracks are set in a fictitious 1983, where Ginger Root is asked to write and produce music for the up-and-coming Japanese pop idol, Kimiko Takeguchi. Right before Kimiko Takeguchi's American debut on a late night show, she quits, leaving her manager in shambles. She makes the last minute decision to have Ginger Root perform in her place, since he knows all the songs. The EP focuses on imposter syndrome and not being yourself. It released on September 9th, 2022 and also had a  limited vinyl, CD and cassette release.

Discography

Albums

Live albums

EPs

Singles

References 

One-man bands
Musical groups from California
Huntington Beach, California